Euchorthippus is a genus of short-horned grasshoppers belonging to the family Acrididae and the subfamily Gomphocerinae.  Species are recorded from Europe and temperate Asia.

Species
The Orthoptera Species File lists:
 Euchorthippus acarinatus Zheng, Z. & D. He, 1993
 Euchorthippus albolineatus (Lucas, 1849)
 Euchorthippus angustulus Ramme, 1931
 Euchorthippus aquatilis Zhang, F., 1994
 Euchorthippus arabicus Uvarov, 1952
 Euchorthippus changlingensis Ren, Bingzhong & Zhao, 2001
 Euchorthippus chenbaensis Tu & Z. Zheng, 1964
 Euchorthippus cheui Hsia, 1964
 Euchorthippus chopardi Descamps, 1968
 Euchorthippus choui Zheng, Z., 1980
 Euchorthippus dahinganlingensis Zhang, F. & Bingzhong Ren, 1992
 Euchorthippus declivus (Brisout, 1848)
 Euchorthippus elegantulus Zeuner, 1940
 Euchorthippus flexucarinatus Bi, D. & Hsia, 1987
 Euchorthippus fusigeniculatus Jin, Xingbao & F. Zhang, 1983
 Euchorthippus herbaceus Zhang, F. & Xingbao Jin, 1985
 Euchorthippus liupanshanensis Zheng, Z. & D. He, 1993
 Euchorthippus madeirae Uvarov, 1935
 Euchorthippus nigrilineatus Zheng, Z. & X. Wang, 1993
 Euchorthippus pulvinatus (Fischer-Waldheim, 1846)
 Euchorthippus ravus Liang & F.L. Jia, 1992
 Euchorthippus sardous Nadig, 1934
 Euchorthippus sinucarinatus Zheng, Z. & X. Wang, 1993
 Euchorthippus transcaucasicus Tarbinsky, 1930
 Euchorthippus unicolor (Ikonnikov, 1913)
 Euchorthippus vittatus Zheng, Z., 1980
 Euchorthippus weichowensis Chang, K.S.F., 1937
 Euchorthippus yungningensis Tu & Z. Zheng, 1964
 Euchorthippus zhongtiaoshanensis Zheng, Z. & R. Lu, 2002
 Euchorthippus zuojianus Zhang, F. & Bingzhong Ren, 1993

References

 
Acrididae genera